FC Tallinn is a football club based in Tallinn, Estonia. Founded in 2017, The club competes in Esiliiga, the second-highest division of Estonian football.

History 
FC Tallinn was founded on 17 November 2017 and started operating in Lasnamäe, the most populous district in Tallinn of which majority is Russian-speaking. The club was created after FC Infonet's merger with Levadia left Lasnamäe's football future in uncertainty. The club entered the Estonian league system in 2018 and quickly rose to Esiliiga B, which they won in the 2022 season after narrowly beating JK Tabasalu in the last second of the final matchday.

Players

Current squad
 ''As of 27 January 2021.

Personnel

Current technical staff

Statistics

League and Cup

References

External links
  
 FC Tallinn at Estonian Football Association

Harju County
Football clubs in Estonia
2017 establishments in Estonia